Michel Jourdain Sr.,  Michel Jourdain Declercq (born August 25, 1947) is a Mexican former racing driver from Mexico City.

Born in Belgium, Jourdain's family emigrated to Mexico when he was 4. Jourdain competed in a number of different Mexican racing series and competed in the CART's 1980 Primera Copa Indy 150 at Autodromo Hermanos Rodriguez in his hometown of Mexico City. He started 20th in an Offy powered Eagle but was knocked out after 5 laps by an oil line failure. He entered the race two weeks later at Phoenix International Raceway but failed to qualify. He drove in the 1981 Mexico City race but was again knocked out by an oil line failure after 18 laps. He competed in the Baja 1000 in 2004 and 2005 alongside his son Michel Jr. and brother Bernard who both also competed in CART. They won the Baja Challenge class for Celebrity Pro-Am teams in 2004 and placed third in 2005.

Jourdain is also a motorsport promoter and track owner. In 1984 he founded the  Mexican Fórmula K, later Formula 2 and Formula 3000. He became manager of the Autódromo Hermanos Rodríguez in the 1990s. In 1997 he founded the Copa Mustang. In 2004 he became manager of the Desafío Corona. In 2011 he created the Super Copa Telcel. He has been described as the "Bill France of Mexico", having said in 2003 to have founded 28 different racing series.

References

1947 births
Champ Car drivers
Mexican racing drivers
Mexican people of Belgian descent
Racing drivers from Mexico City
Trans-Am Series drivers
Living people
Belgian emigrants to Mexico